Yorkshire Island is a small island in the east end of Lake Ontario, off Prince Edward County.  It is part of a chain of islands, including Stoney Island, Galloo Island, Main Duck Island, and Swetman Island and Timber Island, the False Duck Islands.  It was acquired by Parks Canada, in 1977, to preserve as nature preserves.

Joseph O. Doyle was shipwrecked on the Island, for 18 days, in 1858.

References

Islands of Lake Ontario in Ontario